The 1894 Swarthmore Quakers football team was an American football team that represented Swarthmore College as an independent during the 1894 college football season. The team compiled a 5–5 record and outscored opponents by a total of 230 to 202. Jacob K. Shell was the head coach.  Hodge was the captain.

The rivalry game against Haverford is considered to have the first "action shot" photograph during a football game.

Schedule

References

Swarthmore
Swarthmore Garnet Tide football seasons
Swarthmore Quakers football